40S ribosomal protein S4, X isoform is a protein that in humans is encoded by the RPS4X gene.

Ribosomes, organelles that catalyze protein synthesis, consist of a small 40S subunit and a large 60S subunit. Together these subunits are composed of 4 RNA species and approximately 80 structurally distinct proteins. This gene encodes ribosomal protein S4, a component of the 40S subunit. Ribosomal protein S4 is the only ribosomal protein known to be encoded by more than one gene, namely this gene and ribosomal protein S4, Y-linked (RPS4Y). The 2 isoforms encoded by these genes are not identical, but are functionally equivalent. Ribosomal protein S4 belongs to the S4E family of ribosomal proteins. This gene is not subject to X-inactivation. It has been suggested that haploinsufficiency of the ribosomal protein S4 genes plays a role in Turner syndrome; however, this hypothesis is controversial. As is typical for genes encoding ribosomal proteins, there are multiple processed pseudogenes of this gene dispersed through the genome.

References

Further reading

Ribosomal proteins